Samantha Heath (6 June 1960 – 29 March 2019) was the Chief Executive of London Sustainability Exchange from 2005 to 2018; a voluntary organisation supporting the delivery of London as the most sustainable world city. She was a member and former co-chair of the London Sustainable Development Commission and was a member of the London Climate Change Partnership. She also sat on the Stratford City Environmental Review panel. Her experience included ten years in London politics, eight years in academia and research and ten years in civil engineering.

Prior to joining LSx, Heath was Sustainability Manager for Future London, the capital's regeneration centre of excellence. From May 2000 until 2004, she was a London-wide London Assembly Member, where her roles included Deputy Chair of the London Assembly and Chair of the Assembly's Environment Committee. In 2003, she was the Mayor's representative on the Energy Taskforce - part of the London Sustainable Development Commission, and responsible for setting a carbon emission reduction target for London.  In 2004, she became chair of the DTI / GLA London Renewables group. As lead member for the Mayor on London Waste Action, the precursor to the London Waste & Recycling Board, she facilitated funding for London's waste awareness campaign.

She wrote for various publications and spoke at numerous conferences and seminars on: community empowerment, lifestyle change, social marketing, air quality, energy, waste and other issues. For ten years, she was a National Executive Member of SERA - Labour's Environment Campaign.

Heath trained as a Civil Engineer at Heriot Watt and worked for many years in the construction industry. She was a lecturer in design and construction management at the University of Greenwich until May 2000. For eight years from May 1994 until she stood down in May 2002, Heath was a Wandsworth Labour PartyCouncillor, representing the Latchmere Ward in Battersea. She served on the Education, Housing and Environment committees 1994–2002, and was the lead member for the Labour Party on housing in London Borough of Wandsworth up until the May 2000 election for the GLA.

She was third on the Labour party list in the 2000 London Assembly election and won a seat due to this.  She led on environmental and energy issues in the Assembly, becoming the first chair of the Environment Committee, which she chaired for the whole four-year term. In the 2004 election the Labour Party failed to poll enough votes to give her a seat.

References

External links
Biography from the London Assembly
London Sustainability Exchange

1960 births
2019 deaths
Labour Members of the London Assembly
Councillors in the London Borough of Wandsworth
Women councillors in England